Molly Hannis (born March 13, 1992) is an American competition swimmer who specializes in breaststroke events. She currently represents the Cali Condors which is part of the International Swimming League.

Career

College
Hannis attended the University of Tennessee, where she competed for the Tennessee Volunteers swimming and diving team from 2011 to 2015. During her four years in college Hannis was a 2-time NCAA champion and a 14-time NCAA All-American.

2016 Summer Olympics

At the 2016 US Olympic trials in Omaha, Hannis placed second in the 200 meter breaststroke and qualified for the 2016 Summer Olympics in Rio de Janeiro.

International Swimming League
In 2019 she was a member of the inaugural International Swimming League representing the Cali Condors, who finished third place in the final match in Las Vegas, Nevada in December. Hannis finished 2nd in the 50 meter breaststroke and 3rd in the 100 meter breaststroke at the final. In the 2020 Season She stayed with the Cali Condors and helped them win their 1st ISL title. Hannis finished 4th in the 200 Breaststroke, 4th in the 50 Breaststroke, 3rd in the 100 Breaststroke, and finished 2nd in the Breaststroke skins.

Personal life
In May of 2020, Hannis announced her engagement to swimmer Matthew Dunphy.

References

External links
 
 
 
 
 
 Molly Hannis at the 2019 Pan American Games

1992 births
Living people
American female breaststroke swimmers
Olympic swimmers of the United States
Swimmers at the 2016 Summer Olympics
Pan American Games medalists in swimming
Pan American Games gold medalists for the United States
Swimmers at the 2019 Pan American Games
Medalists at the 2019 Pan American Games
Medalists at the FINA World Swimming Championships (25 m)
Tennessee Volunteers women's swimmers
University of Tennessee alumni
20th-century American women
21st-century American women